Staroyanbayevo (İśke Yanbay) is a rural locality (a village) and the administrative centre of Staroyanbayevsky Selsoviet, Baltachevsky District, Bashkortostan, Russia. The population was 325 as of 2010. There are 12 streets.

Geography 
Staroyanbayevo is located 22 km southeast of Starobaltachevo (the district's administrative centre) by road. Bigildino is the nearest rural locality.

References 

Rural localities in Baltachevsky District